Hotgi is a suburb of Solapur in Solapur district. It is the main junction of central railway.  It is known for Chhanaveer Shivacharya Bruhanmath. NTPC is just 3km from Hotgi. It is electricity production factory.

References

Cities and towns in Solapur district